The Elves and the Otterskin is a novel by Elizabeth Boyer published in 1981.

Plot summary
The Elves and the Otterskin is a novel in which a young apprentice wizard must complete the quest of his master to prevent a war between elves and dwarves by slaying a dragon, after the master is killed.

Reception
Greg Costikyan reviewed The Elves and the Otterskin in Ares Magazine #12 and commented that "competently written, but with nothing new to say [...] Light entertainment. So, now what?"

Reviews
Review by Andy Sawyer (1986) in Paperback Inferno, #63

References

1981 novels